The Comeaux House is a historic house located at 101 East 2nd Street in Broussard, Louisiana.

Built in c.1908 by Edmond Comeaux and his wife Cecile St. Julien Comeaux, the house is a Queen Anne-Colonial Revival style residence with semi-octagonal bay at each end of the facade, a semi-octagonal Doric front gallery and a corner turret. The building was converted to a restaurant with small alterations which did not affect its main architectural features.

The building was listed on the National Register of Historic Places on March 14, 1983.

The structure is actually hosting Nash's Restaurant.

It is one of 10 individually NRHP-listed houses in the "Broussard Multiple Resource Area", which also includes: 
Alesia House
Billeaud House
Martial Billeaud Jr. House
Valsin Broussard House 

Ducrest Building
Janin Store 
Roy-LeBlanc House 
St. Cecilia School 
St. Julien House 
Main Street Historic District

See also
 National Register of Historic Places listings in Lafayette Parish, Louisiana

References

External links
Nash's Restaurant website

Houses on the National Register of Historic Places in Louisiana
Queen Anne architecture in Louisiana
Colonial Revival architecture in Louisiana
Houses completed in 1908
Lafayette Parish, Louisiana
National Register of Historic Places in Lafayette Parish, Louisiana